Lake Bulusan is a lake on Luzon Island in the Philippines.

The lake is accessible either through the Maharlika Highway up to the town of Irosin passing through the towns of Casiguran and Juban. From Irosin it is another ten kilometers to the site. The other is passing through a very scenic route overlooking the Pacific Ocean (San Bernardino Strait) through the towns of Gubat, Barcelona and the center of Bulusan town.

Physical characteristics
Bulusan Lake is formed by tectonic damming and perhaps another crater of a volcano. Its water is greenish and its waterbed is rocky and sandy and parts are muddy.

Fauna
It is home to some endemic species of freshwater fish. It also supports some birds, mammals and some beehives. It is completely surrounded by tropical rainforest.

References

External links
Geographic data related to Lake Bulusan at OpenStreetMap

Bulusan
Landforms of Sorsogon